Eugene Anson Stead Jr. (October 6, 1908 in Atlanta, Georgia – June 12, 2005) is best known as a physician, medical educator, and researcher. He served on the faculties at Harvard, Emory (where he received a Bachelor of Science and MD degree), and Duke universities.  His research in the 1940s paved the way for cardiac catheterization in medicine today. He is the founder of the physician assistant (PA) profession.

National PA day is celebrated in many places on October 6th to commemorate the day the first class of PAs graduated from Duke University in 1967 (it also happens to be Dr. Stead's birthday).

Postgraduate work
In 1967, he graduated the first class of physician assistant students from Duke University's PA program. He interned in internal medicine and surgery at the Peter Bent Brigham Hospital in Boston, Massachusetts and also at Cincinnati General Hospital and Boston City Hospital. His educational philosophy placed emphasis on knowing how to look up information for "just in time" delivery rather than memorizing volumes of information only to forget it before needed.  The niche that he envisioned for PAs was that most health care encounters do not require extensive training and that superior medical care can be delivered by relieving the burden of mundane medical encounters by training PA professionals to know when to seek additional input.  He wanted all PAs to be required to have mentoring relationships with Physicians to ensure access to a larger body of medical knowledge.

Beliefs
Dr. Stead had high hopes for distance education in medical education. He believed and talked regularly about the "politics of medical education" and believed that distance education could replace the first two years of medical school. After studying at home and passing national boards, he believed that medicine could be taught in the clinics and offices of private practices. While he worked and helped build the medical education institutions, he had some disdain for the way they practiced and acted as gatekeepers to the medical profession.

Medical Positions
Chair Dept. of Medicine, Emory University (1942-46)
Dean of the School of Medicine, Emory University (1945-46)
Chair Dept. Of Medicine, Duke University (1947-1967)

See also
Eugene A. Stead, Jr. Thoughts, Insights and Learning - Emphasizes Eugene Stead, Jr.'s medical achievements
Eugene A. Stead Papers at Duke University Medical Center Archives
Physician Assistant Program at Duke University: History
American Academy of Physician Assistants
Central Application Service for Physician Assistants  (CASPA)

Sources
https://web.archive.org/web/20060926160931/http://www.pahx.org/archives_detail.asp?ID=149 - Contains digital photos of letters written by Eugene A. Stead Jr.

References

1908 births
2005 deaths
American cardiologists
Duke University faculty
Duke University alumni
Emory University alumni
Emory University faculty
Harvard University faculty
Emory University School of Medicine alumni
Physicians of Brigham and Women's Hospital
Members of the National Academy of Medicine